Johann Gottlob Lehmann may refer to:

 Johann Gottlob Lehmann (scientist) (1719–1767), German scientist and geologist
 Johann Gottlob Lehmann (classicist) (1782–1837), German classicist